Toki is a run and gun platform game released in arcades in Japan in 1989 by TAD Corporation. It was published in North America by Fabtek. Designed by Akira Sakuma, the game has tongue-in-cheek humor mixed with the action. The player controls an enchanted ape who must battle hordes of jungle monsters with energy balls from his mouth. The ultimate goal is to destroy the evil wizard who cast a spell on the title protagonist; thereby transforming him from an ape back into a human, and rescuing the kidnapped princess. The game was ported to several video game consoles and home computers.

Gameplay
The player must traverse several levels with a miniboss at the end. Despite his apparent handicap, his slowness as an ape, and the fact that almost any attack can kill him, Toki is able to spit powerful shots that will help him in defeating enemies and obstacles that try to slow him down in his mission. There is a timer for each stage.

Toki can make use of items such as power-ups for his spit; lucky rabbit feet which can give Toki bursts of superhuman agility and jumping skill; clocks which add extra time to the countdown; fruit which can add to Toki's bonus points; keys which unlock bonus areas; a special helmet that protects him from upwards attacks (the helmet rather comically resembles an American football helmet); extra lives; and magic coins (food in the Genesis version) which when collected in abundance can obtain Toki an extra life.

Plot
The protagonist of the game is a muscular, loincloth-wearing, Tarzanesque tribesman named Toki (known in Japan and in some ports as JuJu), who up until recently lived a primitive yet contented life in the jungles of a vast and wild island in the South Seas.

This all ends tragically when the beautiful Miho, princess of Toki's tribe of jungle men, and a potential suitor to Toki, is kidnapped by the treacherous witch doctor Vookimedlo. Miho is taken to a vast golden palace at the summit of the island, which Vookimedlo has conjured up for himself to reside in. The wicked shaman then casts a spell to transform all the human inhabitants of the island into various animals and beasts, before they can defend themselves against the evil magic.

Toki himself is transformed into a Geeshergam, one of the ape-like minions of Vookimedlo, although in his primate form, Toki more resembles a gorilla. Fortunately, the great warrior discovers that he is still in control of his own faculties and as an unexpected side effect of the spell cast on him, he can breathe fire and shoot forth various projectiles from his mouth.

Toki then sets off on a quest to pursue and defeat Vookimeldo, rescue princess Miho, and undo the curse which has befallen the island. However, to reach Vookimedlo's golden palace, Toki will have to travel through murky lakes, steep canyons, over frozen ice-capped mountain ranges and lava-spewing volcanoes alike. To progress in his quest and be ultimately victorious, Toki will have to battle all manner of dangerous wild animals and various mutants of Vookimedlo's creation; not to mention Vookimedlo's own abominable guardians who act as level bosses.

Ports
Within the next two years the game was ported to a larger number of home video game consoles and home computers of the time. Ocean Software published versions for the Amiga, Atari ST and Commodore 64, They also advertised versions for the ZX Spectrum and Amstrad CPC and the Spectrum version was previewed in issue 90 of Crash Magazine, but neither port materialized. Taito published ports for the Atari Lynx and the Nintendo Entertainment System. The latter version of the game was slightly altered and featured a health bar so that Toki didn't die after one hit. Sega would later reprogram and retool the game into an exclusive version for the Mega Drive/Genesis known as Toki: Going Ape Spit. This version lacks the non-spit power-ups, but it features additional levels and more detailed graphics compared to the NES version.

In some ports, Toki is named "JuJu", Miho os named "Wanda" and Vookimedlo is named "Dr. Stark". Also, in some ports it is not Vookimedlo who kidnaps princess Miho, but his chief henchman, the half-invisible giant known as Bashtar. In some ports Bashtar is the final boss of the game, and not Vookimedlo.

Reception
In Japan, Game Machine listed Toki on their March 15, 1990 issue as being the sixteenth most-successful table arcade unit of the month.

Toki won a Golden Joystick Award in 1992.

The One gave the Amiga version of Toki an overall score of 88%, calling its gameplay "standard stuff", but praises the variety of gameplay that's outside of the norm, posing such examples as Toki's ability to swim, climb, and ride trolleys, stating that these "all help to make it stand out from the current crop of arcade conversions." The One praises Toki's gameplay, stating that "the gameplay is so well balanced, becoming gradually harder as you get into it", furthermore stating that this is "exactly the way it should be." The One also praises Toki's music and graphics, expressing that "it complements the action perfectly" and "[adds] greatly to the game's appeal", furthermore stating that Toki's animations add "instant appeal", and calls Toki "An enjoyable conversion that's as playable as it is pretty".

Destructoid praises the game for the nostalgia it gave to the reviewer. Despite this, they still didn't see it as a great game at all, and stated that it "isn't a perfect game".

Reviews
Video Game Den
Player One
ST Format
The Video Game Critic
Games-X
Amiga Power
ASM (Aktueller Software Markt)
ASM (Aktueller Software Markt)
Amiga Action
Computer and Video Games
Commodore Format
Retro Archives
Amiga Power
Questicle.net
Zzap!
Computer and Video Games
ST Format
ACE (Advanced Computer Entertainment)
Game Zero
Power Play
Defunct Games
Commodore Force
ST Format
Amiga Joker
Jeuxvideo.com
Game Freaks 365
All Game Guide

Legacy 
An arcade-style platform game with similarly-looking simian characters was in development by Ocean Software for the Atari Jaguar under the working title Apeshit but was later renamed to Toki Goes Apespit at one point during development due to Ocean still retaining the license to Toki, with plans to be published in Winter 1994. However it was never released, likely due to the failure of the Jaguar both commercially and critically.

The original game was also ported by Magic Team for iOS on September 7, 2009 in the United States.

A new, independent enhanced remake was announced in October 2009. It was being developed by Golgoth Studio and was originally targeted for release on PC via Steam, and on home consoles through XBLA, PlayStation Network, and WiiWare. It missed its original 2011 release, and while it wasn't officially cancelled, it was considered vaporware for years, even after being approved on the (now-retired) Steam Greenlight service at the end of 2013. However, on April 5, 2018, Microïds announced that the remake would finally be released on December 4, 2018 for Nintendo Switch. It was then announced for Microsoft Windows, PlayStation 4, and Xbox One on March 28, 2019, for a Q2 2019 release. It was then released in June 2019. This version was then released for the cloud-based platform Amazon Luna on 13 October 2022.

Notes

References

External links 
 Toki at AtariAge
 Toki at GameFAQs
 Toki at Giant Bomb
 Toki at Killer List of Videogames
 Toki at MobyGames

1989 video games
Amiga games
Arcade video games
Atari games
Atari ST games
Atari Lynx games
Cancelled Amstrad CPC games
Cancelled Atari 7800 games
Cancelled Atari Jaguar games
Cancelled ZX Spectrum games
Fabtek games
Golden Joystick Award winners
Video games about shapeshifting
IOS games
Classic Mac OS games
Microïds games
Multiplayer and single-player video games
Nintendo Entertainment System games
Nintendo Switch games
Ocean Software games
Platform games
PlayStation 4 games
Run and gun games
Sega video games
Sega Genesis games
TAD Corporation games
Taito arcade games
Video game remakes
Video games about primates
Video games developed in France
Video games set on fictional islands
Windows games
Xbox One games
Video games developed in Japan